KDCA may refer to:

 Kadazandusun Cultural Association, an association of the indigenous ethnic groups of Sabah, Malaysia
 Ronald Reagan Washington National Airport (ICAO: KDCA), an airport in Virginia, United States
 Korea Disease Control and Prevention Agency